Comet Bennett, formally known as C/1969 Y1 (old style 1970 II and 1969i), was one of the two bright comets observed in the 1970s, along with Comet West. The name is also borne by an altogether different comet, C/1974 V2. Discovered by John Caister Bennett on December 28, 1969 while still almost two AUs from the Sun, it reached perihelion on March 20, passing closest to Earth on March 26, 1970 as it receded, peaking at magnitude 0. It was last observed on February 27, 1971.

Observational history 
The comet was discovered by John Caister Bennett on 28 December 1969 from Pretoria, South Africa, during his comet seeking routine. The comet was located in the costellation Tucana, in 65° south declination, and had an estimated magnitude of 8.5. At that time the comet was about 1.7 AU both from the Sun and the Earth. The orbit was computed by M. P. Candy of the Perth Observatory and it became apparent that the comet could became a bright object by the end of March, during its perihelion at a distance of 0.54 AU, as it moved northwards.

The comet became visible to the naked eye in February, and the first week of that month it had a magnitude of 5 and its tail measured about one degree in length. By the end of February the comet had brightened to a magnitude of 3.5 while its tail was about two degrees long. The comet continued to brighten during March, as it approached both the Sun and Earth. By the middle of the month it was a first magnitude with a prominent curved tail about 10 degrees long.

The comet reached perihelion on 20 March and crossed the equator on 25 March, becoming better visible in the morning sky of the north hemisphere, staying at an elongation greater than 32 degrees. On 26 March was the perigee of the comet, when it approached Earth at a distance of 0.69 AU. The comet was then at the square of the Pegasus and continued moving northwards until it reached its maximum north declination of 83° in August, when the comet was in the constellation of Camelopardalis. The comet at the start of April had a magnitude of 1, but as it receded both from the Sun and Earth, it had dimmed to a magnitude of 3-4 by the end of April, when its circumpolar, located in Cassiopeia. The comet had in April two tails, with the longest being 20-25 degrees long. Although by the start of May the comet head had faded to magnitude 5, its tail was still 10-15 degrees long, but by the end of the month it was only 2.5 degrees long. It was last seen by naked eye around mid May.

The comet was observed to fade during summer, autumn and winter. By the start of July it was around magnitude 10 and by the September it was magnitude 12. In January of 1971 it was photographed as a 18.9 magnitude object. It was last photographed by Elizabeth Roemer on 27 February 1971, when the comet was 4.9 AU from the Sun and 5.3 AU from Earth.

Apollo 13 attempted photograph 
Comet Bennett was intended to be photographed by the crew of Apollo 13 during their journey to the Moon. Their first attempt on April 13, 1970 was unsuccessful. On April 14, 1970, after completing the maneuver to orient the spacecraft for a second attempt, Odysseys service module ruptured, forcing the cancellation of the mission's scientific objectives and touchdown on the lunar surface.

References

External links
 Cometography.com
 Orbital simulation from JPL (Java) / Ephemeris

Long-period comets
1969 in science
1970 in science
Discoveries by amateur astronomers